Abro, Abra, Abda clan is descended from Jams of Samma Dynasty migrated from Abdasa area of Kutch in 1314 AD and are settled in southern Sindh to the northern Sindh, Bahawalpur (princely state) and Balochistan.

Notable people bearing the name Abro include:
 Allama Ali Khan Abro
 Jamal Abro (1924-2004), Pakistani writer
 Mazhar Abro
 Murad Abro
 Sohai Ali Abro
 Suhaee Abro
 Tariq Alam Abro, writer
  Mir Abdul Majid Abro, Politician

References

Sindhi-language surnames